Alec Pecker (2 September 1893 – 1975) was a British painter. His work was part of the painting event in the art competition at the 1948 Summer Olympics.

References

1890s births
1975 deaths
20th-century British painters
British male painters
Olympic competitors in art competitions
Place of birth missing
19th-century British male artists
20th-century British male artists
Emigrants from the Russian Empire to the United Kingdom